"Secrets" is a song by Dutch DJ Tiësto and American producer Kshmr, featuring vocals from Australian singer Vassy. The song was released on 16 March 2015 through Musical Freedom, while distribution was handled by Universal Music. A music video was later published through the Spinnin' Records YouTube channel on 18 March, as well as uploaded to Tiësto's Vevo channel on 9 April. The track was featured on Tiësto's 2015 mixed compilation album Club Life: Volume Four New York City.

Reviews 
Fabien Dori from French webmedia Guettapen recognizes the quality of the track : "they are still some good big room releases. That new collaboration of Tiësto and Kshmr, gone with Vassy vocals, is just enjoyable. It makes pleasure to hear some big room tracks as well produced as 'Secrets'."

Music Video
The music video was directed by Robert Schober and takes place in a futuristic universe of Cyberpunk type. It features a man and a woman entering an abandoned games store. They repair the games and use the batteries on their bugs on their necks. This gives them the power to activate games by touching them, such as a motorcycle game and laser shooting guns. When they were playing the laser shooting gun game, the man sees a safe and discovers some money inside of it. The woman sees the man stealing the money, and is very disappointed in him and activates the alarm. Shocked at the alarm, he exits the store to find the police rounding the store. 
Actually, the man is wearing a VR headset and the woman is his wife, sleeping in bed next to him.

Tracklist 
Digital download (MF120)
 "Secrets" - 4:27

Digital download (MF131)
 "Secrets" (Don Diablo's VIP Mix) - 4:19

 Digital download (PM:AM)
 "Secrets" (Radio Edit) - 3:36

 Digital download / Remixes (PM:AM)
 "Secrets" (Future House Extended) - 3:20
 "Secrets" (Don Diablo Remix) - 4:15
 "Secrets" (Don Diablo's VIP Mix) - 4:19
 "Secrets" (David Zowie Remix) - 4:58
 "Secrets" (Felon Remix) - 5:02
 "Secrets" (ZAXX & Jaylex Remix) - 3:19
 "Secrets" (Riggi & Piros Remix) - 3:38

2017 7" blue vinyl
 "Secrets" (Extended Mix) - 4:27
 "Secrets" (Radio Edit) - 3:37

Credits and personnel
Songwriting - Tijs Verwest, Niles Hollowell-Dhar, Vasiliki Karagiorgos, Phil Bentley
Production - Tiësto, Kshmr
Vocals - VASSY
Label: Musical Freedom / Spinnin' Records

Charts

Weekly charts

Year-end charts

Certifications

References

2015 singles
2015 songs
Tiësto songs
Songs written by Tiësto
Songs written by Kshmr
Spinnin' Records singles
Kshmr songs
Vassy (singer) songs